Prionapteryx indentella, the buffalograss webworm, is a moth in the family Crambidae. It was described by William D. Kearfott in 1908. It is found in the US states of Kansas and Texas.

Adults are smoky ocherous brown. Females are larger and lighter in color. Adults are on wing from August to September in one generation per year.

The larvae feed on Buchloe dactyloides. They are solitary and inhabit vertical tunnels attached to individual horizontal surface tubes. The species overwinters as a young larva. Pupation takes place within vertical tunnels.

References

Ancylolomiini
Moths described in 1908